Frankenhooker is a 1990 American black comedy horror film directed by Frank Henenlotter. Very loosely inspired by Mary Shelley's 1818 novel Frankenstein; or, The Modern Prometheus, the film stars James Lorinz as medical school drop-out Jeffrey Franken and former Penthouse Pet Patty Mullen as the title character.

Plot 
Jeffrey Franken, a young man who lives in New Jersey, is a worker at a power plant and a scientist who specializes in bioelectricity. He is about to get married to his fiancée Elizabeth. At the birthday party of Elizabeth's father, Jeffrey presents him with an automatic lawnmower as a gift, but when Elizabeth tries to demonstrate it, she's caught in its path and gruesomely killed.

Jeffrey, in his grief, begins plotting to use his knowledge of circuits to rebuild Elizabeth and bring her back to life. His grief drives him to have mock dinner dates with the few pieces of Elizabeth he could salvage, as well as performing self-trepanations with a power drill to help him calm down. He decides to make the perfect new body for Elizabeth by harvesting the body of a New York City prostitute.

After meeting several girls and their abusive pimp Zorro, a muscle-bound temperamental crack dealer, Jeffrey tricks Zorro into letting him rent every one of the girls for a single night to find the one with the perfect body for Elizabeth. Inspired by a news report about crack cocaine causing the deaths of many New York prostitutes, he then develops a "super-crack" which he finds causes living beings to explode. Deciding he's doing nothing wrong as crack will probably kill the prostitutes anyway, Jeffrey lures them all into a hotel room under the guise of a "medical examination" and marks the girls with the body parts he wants for Elizabeth. However, as he begins to have second thoughts, the prostitutes all find the bag of super-crack and all smoke it despite Jeffrey's pleas, causing them all to explode into pieces.

Zorro hears the commotion and rushes to the room only to be knocked out by one of the flying heads of his girls. Jeffrey hurriedly puts the body parts into trash bags, promising to restore the girls once he brings Elizabeth back. After picking the perfect body parts and sewing them and Elizabeth's head together into a single body, Jeffrey uses the lightning from a nearby storm to shock Elizabeth's new body to life again. However, her body and face move awkwardly, and she can only repeat what the previous girls said before they died. The "Frankenhooker" escapes the basement and begins looking for customers, who end up exploding from electricity when they try getting intimate with her.

Jeffrey goes looking for Elizabeth and finds her at a bar. Unfortunately, Zorro is there too, and upon hearing her mention his name and recognizing her body parts, he angrily strikes her so hard that her head mostly detaches from her body. Jeffrey evades Zorro and takes Elizabeth home to repair her neck and revive her again.

After bolting her head more securely to her new body, Jeffrey wakes Elizabeth up, finding her memory restored. At first, Elizabeth is impressed that Jeffrey brought her back, but becomes furious when she realizes what her body is now made of and how Jeffrey obtained the parts. Jeffrey tries to explain himself, but he is attacked and decapitated by Zorro, who's followed him home. Zorro then attempts to drag Elizabeth away with him, justifying himself by claiming that most of her new body belongs to him. However, the spare hooker parts have also been reanimated by the storm and merged into multiple grotesque limbed monsters, which overwhelm Zorro and drag him away into their storage cooler to his presumable death, along with his drugs.

Elizabeth decides to revive Jeffrey via the same procedure he used on her, but since the process only works on female bodies, Elizabeth is forced to put Jeffrey's head on a body made of the hookers' body parts to bring him back. As Jeffrey awakens, Elizabeth happily says they'll be together forever as Jeffrey moans in horror at his new female body.

Cast 
 James Lorinz as Jeffrey Franken
 Patty Mullen as Elizabeth Shelley/Frankenhooker
 Joanne Ritchie as Mrs. Shelley
 Paul-Felix Montez as Goldie
 Joseph Gonzalez as Zorro the Pimp
 J.J. Clark as Mr. Shelley
 Gregory Martin as Rufus McClure
 Carissa Channing as Dolores
 Shirl Bernheim as Elizabeth's Grandmother
 Hannah York as Mary Jane 
 Helmar Augustus Cooper as Detective Anderson
 Heather Hunter as Chartreuse 
 Louise Lasser as Mrs. Franken
 Charlotte Kemp (credited as Charlotte Helmkamp) as Honey
 Lia Chang as Crystal
 Kimberly Taylor as Amber
 Shirley Stoler as Spike the Bartender
 Jennifer DeLora as Angel

Release 
Frankenhooker'''s initial release was delayed because of difficulty obtaining an R rating from the MPAA; the director recalls that one representative of the ratings body actually said, in a phone call to the production company's secretary, "Congratulations, you're the first film rated S." And she said, "S? For sex?" And they said, "No, S for shit."  To his dismay, Henenlotter's conservative parents insisted on attending the film's premiere in New York City; Henenlotter expressed surprise that they were not offended by the exploitative elements.

 Reception 
The film has a 57% on Rotten Tomatoes based on 14 reviews, with an average rating of 5.09/10. Variety wrote, "Frankenhooker is a grisly, grotesque horror comedy recommended only for the stout of heart and strong of stomach."  Vincent Canby of The New York Times wrote that "there is a legitimate sense of the absurd lurking within Frank Henenlotter's Frankenhooker," but it is "overshadowed by special effects" and elements that recall soft-core pornography.  Kevin Thomas of the Los Angeles Times called it a "hilarious, totally outrageous grin-and-gore comedy."Frankenhooker was named "Killer B Film of the Year for 1990" by E! Entertainment Television's Attack of the Killer B's segment.

Bill Murray was quoted as saying "If you see one movie this year, it should be Frankenhooker."  Henenlotter said that Murray had been editing his film Quick Change and hung out with the Frankenhooker crew.  After Murray expressed interest in their film, the distributor attempted to get an endorsement from him.  Embarrassed that they would abuse Murray's friendliness, Henenlotter attempted to avoid Murray.  When they eventually ran into each other, Henenlotter apologized and explained that he was not responsible.  Satisfied with the explanation, Murray volunteered a quotation.

 Home media Frankenhooker was released on VHS in 1990, by Shapiro-Glickenhaus Entertainment, and had an interactive box which had the titular character exclaim "wanna date?!" when you pressed a button on the box.

On November 8, 2011, Synapse Films released Frankenhooker on Blu-ray. This edition has reversible cover art, with the original theatrical poster on one side and newly commissioned artwork on the reverse side. The disc contains a 2K high definition transfer of the film and a digitally remastered 5.1 audio mix, as well as an audio commentary track from writer/director Frank Henenlotter and make-up effects designer Gabe Bartalos, three featurettes and the original theatrical trailer. The special features from this release were also available on the DVD version of the film, released on September 10, 2013.

On January 2, 2012, Arrow Films released a special edition Blu-ray of Frankenhooker. Like the Synapse release before it, this edition also has reversible cover art, featuring both the original theatrical poster art and newly commissioned art (different from the Synapse version). This edition includes many UK exclusives, including an audio commentary from Henenlotter and star James Lorinz, a documentary titled "Your Date's on a Place" and a tour of Gabe Bartalos' effects lab in Los Angeles. It also includes all three featurettes from the Synapse release, as well as trailers for the films Basket Case, Basket Case 2 and Brain Damage'', all of which were also directed by Henenlotter.

See also 

 List of films featuring Frankenstein's monster

References

External links 
 
 

1990 films
1990 horror films
1990s black comedy films
1990s comedy horror films
1990 independent films
1990s monster movies
1990s science fiction horror films
American black comedy films
American body horror films
American comedy horror films
American independent films
American monster movies
American science fiction horror films
American splatter films
1990s English-language films
Films about cocaine
Films about couples
Films about murderers
Films about prostitution in the United States
Films directed by Frank Henenlotter
Films set in New Jersey
Films set in New York City
Films shot in New Jersey
Films shot in New York City
Frankenstein films
Films scored by Joe Renzetti
Resurrection in film
American exploitation films
1990 comedy films
1990s American films